Looking at You, Looking at Me is the seventh full-length studio recording from singer/songwriter/drummer/producer Narada Michael Walden. It was Walden's last album to be released by Atlantic Records and peaked at No. 51 on the Billboard Top R&B albums chart.

The album's lead single "Black Boy" failed to chart. However, the cover of "Reach Out I'll Be There" reached No. 40 on the Billboard R&B singles chart.

Track listing

Personnel
As listed on the back cover of the Looking at You, Looking at Me vinyl album:

Narada Michael Walden - lead vocals (all tracks), drums (all tracks), percussion (1, 4), acoustic piano (1 or 2)^, Prophet synthesizer (3, 5 - 9), timbales (8), horn arrangement (3, 5)
Joaquin "Garfield" Lievano - guitar (1, 2; solo on 2)
Preston "Smoke" Glass - acoustic guitars (1, 2)
Corrado "Rod" Rustici - guitar (3 - 6, 8), 50s guitar and solo (7), acoustic and electric guitars (9), finger snaps (2)
Randy "The King" Jackson - bass (1 - 6, 8, 9; solo on 5), finger snaps (2)
David "Slam Dunk" Sancious - Synthesizers (1, 2), O.B.X. kalimba (1), O.B.X. (3, 4, 6, 7, 9), keyboards (3), acoustic piano (4, 5), harmonica licks (6), blues licks (7), synthesizer harmonica (9)
Mitchell "Broom" Froom - Moog bells (1), gun shot (2)
Frank "Killer Bee" Martin - synthesizers (3 - 5), Rhodes (4), string synthesizer (6, 8), organ (7)
Frankie Beverly and Maze - "Reach!" backing vocals (1)
Kelly Kool - backing vocals (1 - 4, 6, 7, 8), role of "Tina" (7), handclaps (5)
Carla "Vae Vae" Vaughn - backing vocals (1 - 4, 6, 7, 8), handclaps (5)
Jim Gilstrap, Myrna Matthews, John Lehman - backing vocals (1 - 4, 6, 8), handclaps (5)
Jerry Hey - trumpet and fluegelhorn (2 - 5), horn arrangement (2, 4, 5)
Chuck Findley - trumpet and fluegelhorn (2 - 5)
Marc Russo - alto saxophone (2 - 5, 7; solos on 4 and 7)
Herman "Sabian" Jackson - finger snaps (2)
Michael "Buffy" Gibbs - string arrangements (2, 4, 6)
Jeff Cohen - "Chief of the S.F. Fire Department" (3)
Angela Bofill - guest vocals (4)
Sheila Escovedo - percussion (4, 8)
Lisa Walden, Dwayne Simmons - handclaps (5)
Andy Narell - steel drums and solo (8)
The Jamaican Family - backing vocals (8)
Mark Robertson - Mellotron (9)

^Walden is listed as having played acoustic piano on Track 1; however, no acoustic piano is evident on this track.  Conversely, whoever plays the (clearly-audible) acoustic piano on Track 2 is uncredited; it is thus possible that Walden is miscredited with performing the piano on Track 1, when he in fact played it on Track 2.

Charts

References

External links
Looking At You, Looking At Me at Discogs

1983 albums
Narada Michael Walden albums
Albums produced by Narada Michael Walden
Atlantic Records albums